The Botanischer Garten München-Nymphenburg (21.20 hectares) is a botanical garden and arboretum located at Menzinger Str. 65, Munich, Bavaria, Germany. It is open daily, except on 24 and 31 December; an admission fee is charged.

History 
Munich's first botanical garden, now called the "old botanical garden", was established in 1809 to designs by Friedrich Ludwig von Sckell near Karlsplatz, where its remains are still visible. The old botanical garden was replaced by a new garden created next to the park of Schloss Nymphenburg in 1912/13 and officially opened on 10 May 1914. The garden was designed by Peter Holfelder (1878–1936) who worked closely with Walter Kupper (1874–1953) and Leonhard Dillis (1871–1946).

Description 
Today the garden cultivates about 19,600 species and subspecies on approximately 18 hectares. Its mission is to provide a beautiful and restful environment as well as educate the public about plants and nature more broadly. Major collections include an alpine garden, an arboretum, rose collections, and a so-called 'systematic garden' in which plants are arranged by taxonomic families.

The garden also contains an extensive greenhouse complex (4,500 m² total area in 11 greenhouses), including greenhouses dedicated to bromeliads and aroids Araceae, cacti and succulents, cycads, ferns, orchids, and Mexican plants. The orchid collection includes over 2700 species from 270 genera, as well as hybrids, with special collections of Catasetinae, Cattleya (unifoliates), Cymbidium, Dendrobium, Dracula, Paphiopedilum, Phragmipedium, Pleione, Stanhopeinae, Vanda, and Zygopetalinae.

The garden also maintains an external station, the Alpengarten auf dem Schachen (1,860 m altitude).

See also 
 Alpengarten auf dem Schachen
 Botanische Staatssammlung München
 List of botanical gardens in Germany

Gallery

External links 

 
 Stanhopeinae Image Database: 19 genera and 219 species
 Gesellschaft der Freunde des Botanischen Gartens München e.V.
 Qype entry, with photographs

Munchen-Nymphenburg, Botanischer Garten
Munchen-Nymphenburg, Botanischer Garten
Tourist attractions in Munich